Koffi Fiawoo (born 3 October 1969) is a Togolese former professional footballer who played as a striker.

He was part of the Togo national team at the 2000 African Cup of Nations team, which finished bottom of group A in the first round of competition, thus failing to secure qualification for the quarter-finals.

External links
 
 

1969 births
Living people
Togolese footballers
Association football forwards
Togo international footballers
2000 African Cup of Nations players
Ligue 1 players
Ligue 2 players
Chamois Niortais F.C. players
Le Mans FC players
Louhans-Cuiseaux FC players
FC Sochaux-Montbéliard players
FC Lorient players
US Créteil-Lusitanos players
21st-century Togolese people